Tankersley is a civil parish in the metropolitan borough of Barnsley, South Yorkshire, England.  The parish contains twelve listed buildings that are recorded in the National Heritage List for England.  Of these, one is listed at Grade II*, the middle of the three grades, and the others are at Grade II, the lowest grade.  The parish contains the villages of Tankersley and Pilley, and the surrounding area.  The listed buildings consist of a church, a sundial and a mounting block in the churchyard, houses, farmhouses and farm buildings, a milepost, and a former coal mines rescue station.


Key

Buildings

References

Citations

Sources

 

Lists of listed buildings in South Yorkshire
Buildings and structures in the Metropolitan Borough of Barnsley